Umberto Colombo (1927 – 13 May 2006) was a Jewish-Italian chemical engineer, academic and the minister of universities, science and technology of Italy.

Early life and education
Colombo was born in 1927. He received a PhD in physical chemistry from the University of Pavia. He was a Fulbright Fellow at the Massachusetts Institute of Technology in the United States.

Career
Colombo trained as a chemical engineer  and worked as a professor at the University of Milan in the 1970s. He served as the president of the Italian energy firm Eni for a short period from November 1982 to January 1983  before being appointed as the head of the Italian nuclear energy unit.

From 1993 to 1994 Colombo served as the minister of universities, science and technology in the Ciampi cabinet. Following this he became a member of the Italian national council of economy and labour. He was one of the shareholders of Energy Conversion Devices and became a member of its board of directors in July 1995 before retiring in November 2004.

Other posts that Colombo held included the chairman of ENEA (Italian national agency for new technology, energy and the environment; 1983-1993), president of the European Science Foundation (1991-1993), chairman of the Italian hydrocarbons trust, director general of Montedision's R&D and strategic planning, director of Montecatini's G. Donegani research centre, governor of the international development research centre (IDRC; 1985-1990) in Canada, chairman of the United Nations's advisory committee on science and technology for development (1984-1986), chairman of LEAD-Europe, and president of the European institute research management association. He was also a member of the Club of Rome's executive committee that had been founded by Aurelio Peccei.

Works
In 1989, Colombo and fellow Italian scientist Francesco Scaramuzzi experimented with nuclear fusion reporting that they had successfully created nuclear fusion at room temperature.

Awards
Colombo was the recipient of the Honda Foundation's award for ecotechnology in 1984. He was also awarded China's state international scientific and technological cooperation award in 1999.

Death
Colombo died in Rome on 13 May 2006 aged 78.

References

External links

20th-century Italian engineers
20th-century Italian Jews
20th-century Italian politicians
1927 births
2006 deaths
Eni
Jewish engineers
Jewish Italian scientists
Italian chemical engineers
Italian corporate directors
Government ministers of Italy
Leaders of organizations
Academic staff of the University of Milan
University of Pavia alumni
Independent politicians in Italy